Mikhail Sergeyevich Rekudanov (born 5 May 1985) is a former Russian professional football player.

Club career
He made his Russian Football National League debut for FC Luch-Energiya Vladivostok on 6 November 2005 in a game against FC Sokol Saratov.

Criminal conviction
In June 2013, the Moscow police announced that he is wanted for murder. On 4 December 2013 he was convicted of murder and sentenced to 6 years of imprisonment. According to the court, on 23 May 2013 Rekudanov stabbed a Kyrgyzstan citizen 6 times in a mass brawl on the street while under the influence of alcohol. The sentence was reduced as the victim initiated the fight. He was released on parole in 2018.

References

External links
 
 

1985 births
Footballers from Moscow
Living people
Russian footballers
Association football defenders
FC Luch Vladivostok players
FC Akhmat Grozny players
FC Torpedo Moscow players
FC Saturn Ramenskoye players
FC Khimki players
FC Lukhovitsy players
Russian people convicted of murder